Everaldo Ferreira Magalhaes (born 29 May 1982) is a Brazilian soccer player.

Club career
He started his career in Honduras in Olimpia. He moved to Uruguay to Cerrito on a loan for 3 months where he was injured. He later moved to Real España. He was the goal leader in Liga Nacional de Futbol de Honduras for the 08-09 Apertura.

He has played for River Plate de Montevideo and Cerrito in Uruguay's Primera División.

Everaldo joined Atlético Choloma for the 2012 Clausura after spending time in Guatemalan football. ferreira is currently playing for Sacachispas of the Guatemalan second division. He is usually regarded by Honduran soccer fans as one of the most talented and deadliest strikers of his generation.

References

External links

1982 births
Living people
Brazilian footballers
Club Atlético River Plate (Montevideo) players
Sportivo Cerrito players
Real C.D. España players
C.D. Olimpia players
Club Puebla players
C.S.D. Municipal players
C.D. Malacateco players
Atlético Choloma players
Liga MX players
Liga Nacional de Fútbol Profesional de Honduras players
Brazilian expatriate footballers
Expatriate footballers in Mexico
Expatriate footballers in Uruguay
Expatriate footballers in Honduras
Brazilian expatriate sportspeople in Mexico
Brazilian expatriate sportspeople in Uruguay
Brazilian expatriate sportspeople in Honduras
Expatriate footballers in Guatemala
Association football forwards